The Livingston Awards at the University of Michigan are American journalism awards issued to media professionals under the age of 35 for local, national, and international reporting. They are the largest, all-media, general reporting prizes in America. Popularly referred to as the "Pulitzer for the Young", the awards have recognized the early talent of journalists, including Michele Norris, Christiane Amanpour, David Remnick, Ira Glass, J. R. Moehringer, Thomas Friedman, Rick Atkinson, David Isay, Sharmeen Obaid-Chinoy, Tom Ashbrook, Nicholas Confessore, C. J. Chivers, Michael S. Schmidt and Charles Sennot.

Overview
Unlike other prizes in journalism (such as the George Foster Peabody Awards, the George Polk Awards, the National Journalism Awards and the Pulitzer Prizes), the Livingston Awards judge print, broadcast, and online entries against one another.

Mollie Parnis Livingston, one of America's first fashion designers known by name, established the Livingston Awards in 1981 to honor her son, Robert, who published the journalism review More.  For thirty years, The Mollie Parnis Livingston Foundation, headed by Livingston's nephew Neal Hochman, sponsored the awards. Recent supporters include the Indian Trail Foundation, Christiane Amanpour, the John S. and James L. Knight Foundation, and the University of Michigan.

The winners are selected by the Livingston Board of National Judges. These include Christiane Amanpour, Ken Auletta, Dean Baquet, Charles Gibson, Ellen Goodman, John F. Harris, Clarence Page, and Anna Quindlen. Mike Wallace was one of the national judges for several years.

See also
 List of Livingston Award winners
 List of journalism awards
 Knight-Wallace Fellowship

References

External links
 

1981 establishments in Michigan
American literary awards
American radio awards
American television awards
Competitions in New York City
American journalism awards
University of Michigan
Awards established in 1981